Rayan Souici (born 28 February 1998) is a French professional footballer who plays as a midfielder for Championnat National 2 club Saint-Priest.

Club career
Souici developed through the Saint-Étienne academy. He made his Ligue 1 debut on 5 August 2017, in a 1–0 home win against Nice. He came on after 79 minutes for Oussama Tannane.

International career
Born in France and of Algerian descent, Souici is a former youth international for France.

Career statistics

References

External links
 
 
 Saint-Étienne profile

1998 births
Sportspeople from Lyon Metropolis
French sportspeople of Algerian descent
Living people
French footballers
Association football midfielders
France youth international footballers
AS Saint-Étienne players
Entente SSG players
Servette FC players
Ligue 1 players
Championnat National players
Championnat National 2 players
Championnat National 3 players
Swiss Super League players
French expatriate footballers
Expatriate footballers in Switzerland
French expatriate sportspeople in Switzerland
Footballers from Auvergne-Rhône-Alpes